This is a list of defunct airlines of France.

See also

 List of airlines of France
 List of defunct airlines of Oceania#French Polynesia
 List of defunct airlines of the Americas#Guadeloupe
 List of defunct airlines of the Americas#Martinique
 List of defunct airlines of Oceania#New Caledonia
 List of defunct airlines of Africa#Réunion
 List of airports in France

References

France
 Defunct